The Last Family is a 2016 Polish biographical film directed by Jan P. Matuszyński. The film won the Golden Lions for best film at the 2016 Gdynia Film Festival.

Plot
As renowned painter Zdzislaw Beksinski tapes everything with his camcorder, a 28-year family saga unfolds through his disturbing dystopian paintings, family feuds, near-death experiences, love-hate relations and consecutive funerals. The true story of the artistic Beksinski family: Zdzislaw, his wife Zofia and their talented yet trouble-making son Tomasz.

Cast 
 Andrzej Seweryn - Zdzislaw Beksinski
 Dawid Ogrodnik - Tomasz Beksinski
 Aleksandra Konieczna - Zofia Beksinska
 Andrzej Chyra - Piotr Dmochowski
 Zofia Perczynska - Stanislawa Beksinska
  - Stanislawa Stankiewicz
 Alicja Karluk - Patrycja
 Magdalena Boczarska - Ewa
  - Helena

Reception 

On Rotten Tomatoes, the film has an aggregate score of 75% based on 6 positive and 2 negative critic reviews.

References

External links 

2010s biographical films
Polish biographical films